Typhoon Nuri, known in the Philippines as Typhoon Paeng, was the third most intense tropical cyclone worldwide in 2014. Nuri developed into a tropical storm and received the name Paeng from the PAGASA on October 31, before it intensified into a typhoon on the next day. Under excellent conditions, especially the synoptic scale outflow, Nuri underwent rapid deepening and reached its peak intensity on November 2, forming a round eye in a symmetric Central dense overcast (CDO). Having maintained the impressive structure for over one day, the typhoon began to weaken on November 4, with a cloud-filled eye.

Because of increasing vertical wind shear from the mid-latitude westerlies, Nuri lost the eye on November 5, and deep convection continued to diminish. The storm accelerated northeastward and completely became extratropical on November 6. However, on November 7, Nuri's circulation split, and the new center absorbed the storm.

Meteorological history

After having slowly consolidated for two days, the Joint Typhoon Warning Center (JTWC) issued a Tropical Cyclone Formation Alert to the system on October 30, due to its quickly consolidating but broad low-level circulation center (LLCC) under a favorable environment. Additionally, the Japan Meteorological Agency (JMA) upgraded the low-pressure area to a tropical depression at noon on the same day. The agency upgraded the system to a tropical storm and named it Nuri early on October 31, shortly after the JTWC upgraded it to a tropical depression and designated it as 20W. Under low vertical wind shear and good outflow, a central dense overcast (CDO) started to flare over the LLCC with the tighter wrapped banding, prompting the JTWC upgrading Nuri to a tropical storm in the afternoon. As it entered the Philippine Area of Responsibility, the PAGASA named it Paeng at 23:00 PST (15:00 UTC).

On November 1, Nuri was upgraded to a severe tropical storm at 00:00 UTC and a typhoon at noon by the JMA, when the system was turning northward and forming a microwave eye beneath the compact CDO. Late on the same day, Nuri began to form an eye, and the JTWC upgraded it to a typhoon. The system underwent rapid deepening on November 2, depicting a highly round and sharply-outlined  eye embedded in a symmetric CDO of super-deep convection. It also developed its own mesoscale anticyclone that, in combination with the synoptic scale poleward and equatorward outflow, was providing an extremely efficient ventilation to the associated convection. The JTWC upgraded Nuri to a super typhoon at the same time, and the warning center even indicated that its one-minute maximum sustained winds had reached  six hours later, unofficially recognizing it the strongest tropical cyclone in 2014, tied with Typhoon Vongfong and Typhoon Hagupit in terms of wind speed.

Initially, the JTWC forecast that Nuri would become a record-breaker as strong as Typhoon Haiyan; however, it failed to intensify further. The system retained its impressive structure and turned northeastward along the western periphery of a subtropical ridge to the east on November 3, yet the JTWC indicated that it had begun to gradually weaken owing to warming cloud top temperatures in the afternoon. Early on November 4, the JMA reported that Nuri had started to weaken, and the JTWC downgraded the system to a typhoon. Although vigorous pole-ward outflow into a jet stream located to the northeast of the system offset increasing westerly moderate vertical wind shear, it continued undergoing an eyewall replacement cycle, resulting a cloud-filled eye before noon. Nuri still retained tightly curved banding wrapping into a well-defined LLCC; however, on November 5, the LLCC began to unravel as the deep convection had become isolated to the northern semi-circle, although a weak microwave eye feature remained present. Vigorous poleward outflow into the mid-latitude westerlies became only partially offsetting the increasing vertical wind shear.

Right after the JMA downgraded Nuri to a severe tropical storm at 00:00 UTC on November 6, the JTWC downgraded it to a tropical storm and issued their final warning for the system, due to the extratropical transition and diminishing deep convection. In the afternoon, Nuri accelerated northeastward and became completely extratropical east of Japan. Thanks to the unusually powerful North Pacific jet stream, the extratropical cyclone underwent extremely explosive cyclogenesis on November 7, owing to the energy from differences in air masses. The system split into two centers of low pressure early on the same day, and the former center to the southwest was absorbed into the new center to the northeast within a half a day. The resulting system became the most intense extratropical cyclones observed in the North Pacific Ocean since reliable records began, and indirectly contributed to below-average temperatures in North America.

Impact

Japan
Yoshihide Suga, the Chief Cabinet Secretary of Japan, said that the government of Tokyo would not allow Chinese coral poaching vessels to come ashore when Typhoon Nuri was approaching the area off the Bonin Islands and the Izu Islands. Many of the vessels that had swarmed off the remote islands began leaving the area in a southeasterly direction on November 5, as the Coast Guard patrol ships warned them to go south to get out of the typhoon's path. However, after Nuri left the area of the Tokyo remote islands, the Chinese coral poaching vessels returned.

See also

Typhoon Lekima (2013)
November 2014 Bering Sea cyclone
Typhoon Songda (2016)

References

External links

JMA General Information of Typhoon Nuri (1420) from Digital Typhoon
JMA Best Track Data of Typhoon Nuri (1420) 

20W.NURI from the U.S. Naval Research Laboratory

2014 in Japan
2014 Pacific typhoon season
Typhoons in Japan
Nuri
Nuri